Jarno is a Finnish male given name, which is a variant of Jeremiah. Jarno may refer to:

People

First name
Jarno Elg (born 1975), Finnish killer
Jarno Hams (born 1974), Dutch strongman 
Jarno Heinikangas (born 1979), Finnish football player
Jarno Kärki (born 1994), Finnish ice hockey player
Jarno Koskiranta (born 1986), Finnish ice hockey player
Jarno Kultanen (born 1973), Finnish ice hockey player
Jarno Laasala (born 1979), Finnish actor
Jarno Laur (born 1975), Estonian politician
Jarno Mattila (born 1984), Finnish football player
Jarno Molenberghs (born 1989), Belgian football player
Jarno Opmeer (born 2000), Dutch esports driver
Jarno Parikka (born 1986), Finnish football player
Jarno Pihlava (born 1979), Finnish swimmer
Jarno Saarinen (1945–1973), Finnish motorcycle racer
Jarno Salomaa, Finnish musician
Jarno Sarkula (1973–2020), Finnish musician
Jarno Tenkula (born 1982), Finnish football player
Jarno Trulli (born 1974), Italian racing car driver
Jarno Väkiparta (born 1974), Finnish bandy player

Surname
 Georg Jarno (1868–1920), Hungarian composer
 Josef Jarno (1866–1932), Austrian actor

See also
Jeremiah (given name)

Finnish masculine given names